Pioneers of the Frontier is a 1940 American Western film directed by Sam Nelson and written by Fred Myton. The film stars Wild Bill Elliott, Dorothy Comingore, Dick Curtis, Dub Taylor, Stanley Brown and Richard Fiske. The film was released on February 14, 1940, by Columbia Pictures.

Plot

Cast          
Wild Bill Elliott as Wild Bill Saunders
Dorothy Comingore as Joan Darcey
Dick Curtis as Matt Brawley
Dub Taylor as Cannonball Sims
Stanley Brown as Dave
Richard Fiske as Bart
Carl Stockdale as Jim Darcey
Lafe McKee as Mort Saunders
Ralph McCullough as Lem Watkins
Alan Bridge as Marshal Larsen

References

External links
 

1940 films
American Western (genre) films
1940 Western (genre) films
Columbia Pictures films
Films directed by Sam Nelson
American black-and-white films
1940s English-language films
1940s American films